The Toshiko Akiyoshi – Lew Tabackin Big Band, Novus Series '70 is a compilation album of songs taken from the band's early RCA releases of 1974~1976.

Track listing
All songs orchestrated by Toshiko Akiyoshi.  All songs composed by Akiyoshi except "Yet Another Tear" (Lew Tabackin)  

 "Studio J" – 6:00 (from Insights)
 "American Ballad" – 5:45 (from Kogun)
 "Quadrille, Anyone?" – 6:20 (From Long Yellow Road)
 "Children in the Temple Ground" – 5:27 (From Long Yellow Road)
 "The First Night" – 4:51 (From Long Yellow Road)
 "Kogun" – 10:24 (from Road Time)
 "Since Perry" / "Yet Another Tear" –  12:30 (from Road Time)
 "Road Time Shuffle" – 6:11 (from Road Time)

Personnel
Toshiko Akiyoshi – piano 
Lew Tabackin – tenor saxophone, flute 
Tom Peterson – tenor saxophone
Dick Spencer – alto saxophone
Gary Foster – alto saxophone
Bill Perkins – baritone saxophone ("Studio J", "American Ballad", "The First Night", "Quadrille, Anyone", "Children in the Temple Ground")
Bill Byrne – baritone saxophone ("Kogun", "Since Perry / Yet Another Tear", "Road Time Shuffle")
Bobby Shew – trumpet
Mike Price – trumpet
Steven Huffsteter – trumpet ("Studio J", "Kogun", "Since Perry / Yet Another Tear", "Road Time Shuffle")
Don Rader – trumpet ("American Ballad", "The First Night", "Quadrille, Anyone?", "Children in the Temple Ground")
Richard Cooper – trumpet ("Studio J", "Kogun", "Since Perry / Yet Another Tear", "Road Time Shuffle")
Stu Blumberg – trumpet ("The First Night", "Children in the Temple Ground")
Lynn Nicholson – trumpet ("Quadrille, Anyone?")
John Madrid – trumpet ("American Ballad")
Phil Teele – bass trombone
Charlie Loper – trombone ("Studio J", "American Ballad", "Quadrille, Anyone?", "Children in the Temple Ground", "The First Night")
Britt Woodman – trombone ("Studio J", "American Ballad", "Quadrille, Anyone?", "Children in the Temple Ground", "The First Night")
Jim Sawyer – trombone ("American Ballad", "Kogun", "Since Perry / Yet Another Tear", "Road Time Shuffle")
Bill Reichenbach Jr. – trombone ("Studio J", "Kogun", "Since Perry / Yet Another Tear", "Road Time Shuffle")
Bruce Paulson – trombone ("The First Night", "Quadrille, Anyone?", "Children in the Temple Ground")
Jimmy Knepper – trombone ("Kogun", "Since Perry / Yet Another Tear", "Road Time Shuffle")
Peter Donald – drums
Don Baldwin – bass ("Studio J", "Kogun", "Since Perry / Yet Another Tear", "Road Time Shuffle")
Gene Cherico – bass ("American Ballad", "The First Night", "Quadrille, Anyone?", "Children in the Temple Ground")
Special guests:
Tokuko Kaga – vocal ("Children in the Temple Ground")
Kisaku Katada – kotsuzumi ("Kogun")
Yutaka Yazaki – ōtsuzumi ("Kogun")

Sources / References

BMG 3106-2-N album cover / liner notes   
Toshiko Akiyoshi – Lew Tabackin Big Band (Novus Series '70) review at allmusic.com

Toshiko Akiyoshi – Lew Tabackin Big Band albums
1991 compilation albums